In the Northern Ontario bush, many families lived too far from communities to allow their children to attend school. As a way of providing education to these children of railroad workers, trappers, natives and other people of the bush the Canadian government instituted the school car system (in French: Des écoles sur rails). The school cars ran from 1926 to 1967, and stopped at each site on their route for three to five days out of a month.

References

Transport in Northern Ontario
Education in Ontario